Reggie Jones (born March 15, 1986) is a former American football cornerback. He played college football at Portland State University and the University of Idaho.

Professional career

New Orleans Saints
Jones was originally signed as a free agent by the New Orleans Saints on April 8, 2009. Though he tore his Achilles tendon during the season, he was a part of the 2009 Super Bowl Championship team. He recovered from his injury and the next year made the Saints practice roster.

Washington Redskins
The Washington Redskins claimed Jones off the Saints practice roster promoting him to the active roster on December 29, 2010. He was released by the Redskins on September 4, 2011.

Minnesota Vikings

Virginia Destroyers
Released after final cuts, Jones played in the UFL for the Virginia Destroyers, where he started as a cornerback and won a UFL Championship under coach Marty Schottenheimer.

Dallas Cowboys
Jones was signed to the Dallas Cowboys' in November 2012.

Ottawa Redblacks
Jones signed with the Ottawa Redblacks on January 14, 2014. He was the starting cornerback. He was released by the Redblacks on September 6, 2014.

Other work

Outside of his playing career, Jones leads one of the top youth football programs in the country "Heir Academy" ( HeirSports.com ). Hundreds of collegiate athletes have gone through the Heir Academy program based in Puyallup, WA. The youth tackle program has also been successful, boasting an American Youth Football Conference D1 National Championship. Jones is also a public speaker. On his "Believe Beyond Tour", he appeared in over 50 schools throughout the United States and Canada. He has been highlighted at national youth conferences, leadership conferences, assemblies, youth rallies, and church services. He was featured on the 2014 NSOG (Nothing Short of Greatness) Tour with speaker Trent Shelton. He was the keynote speaker at the youth conference WeDay and the National Youth At-Risk Conference in Savannah, Georgia.

Jones is the Owner and Founder of Heir Football Academy, an instructional program in the state of Washington. This is a nationally ranked program, with many of its members receiving scholarship offers at universities around the country. The platform is designed to meet the needs of position and scheme-specific instruction, as well individual, group, and team training. Instructors are former NFL and NCAA Football players giving back in a physical and mental capacity.

Jones is founder, president, and director of the mentoring program Showtime For Stars, a mentoring program for student athletes. The foundation is supported by various businesses and former professional and collegiate athletes serving as mentors to youth (ages 12–18).

In May 2014, Showtime For Stars put on the 1st Annual Showtime For Stars Golf Tournament, held at the New Castle Golf Club in New Castle, Washington. The same month, the group held the Showtime For Stars Football Skills Camp in Kent, Washington.  NFL athletes from various teams served as coaches and guest speakers. Over 300 participants attended from Washington, California, and Oregon.

References

External links
 Just Sports Stats
 Reggie Jones' official website
 Ottawa Redblacks bio
 HEIR Football Academy
 Showtime For Stars

1986 births
Living people
Portland State Vikings football players
Idaho Vandals football players
New Orleans Saints players
Washington Redskins players
Virginia Destroyers players
Minnesota Vikings players
Dallas Cowboys players
Ottawa Redblacks players
American football defensive backs
Canadian football defensive backs
African-American players of American football
African-American players of Canadian football
Players of American football from Washington (state)
Sportspeople from Bellevue, Washington
21st-century African-American sportspeople
20th-century African-American people